Constant Huret, nicknamed "le Boulanger" (the Baker) (26 January 1870, in Ressons-le-Long – 18 September 1951, in Paris) was a French long distance track racing cyclist.  He was a professional from 1894 to 1902.

Major achievements
He won the 600 km Bordeaux–Paris road race (known as The Derby of the Road) in 1899 and held the record winning time for 34 years. He was also the 1900 world velodrome champion and won the Bol d'Or four times, in 1894, 1895, 1898 and 1902.

In art
He is depicted in La Chaine Simpson by Henri de Toulouse-Lautrec racing for the Simpson Chain team.

Palmarès

1894
1st French National Stayers Championships
1st Bol d'Or
 World records for 24 hours (736km) and 100km
 8 Days of Paris – Vel d'Hiv
1895
1st Bol d'Or
 World records for 6 hours and 24 hours (829.498km)
1896
 World records for 6 hours and 100km
1897
 World records for 6 hours, 100km and 24 hours (909.027km)
1898
1st Bol d'Or
1899
1st Bordeaux–Paris (594km in 16 hours and 35 minutes at an average 36kmh)
1900
1st World Championship, Track, Stayers, Elite, Paris
1902
1st Bol d'Or
 World record for 6 hours

References

External links
Constant Huret's story at Ressons-le-Long Web site

1870 births
1951 deaths
French male cyclists
Sportspeople from Aisne
UCI Track Cycling World Champions (men)
French track cyclists
Cyclists from Hauts-de-France